Buckston may refer to:

Buckston Browne (1850–1945), a British surgeon and urology pioneer
George Buckston (1881–1942), an English cricketer
Robin Buckston (1908–1967), an English cricketer

See also
Bradbourne Hall, ancestral home of the Buxton/Buckston family
Buxton (disambiguation)